Gadopentetic acid, sold under the brand name Magnevist, is a gadolinium-based MRI contrast agent.

It is usually administered as a salt of a complex of gadolinium with DTPA (diethylenetriaminepentacetate) with the chemical formula A2[Gd(DTPA)(H2O)]; when cation A is the protonated form of the amino sugar meglumine the salt goes under the name "gadopentetate dimeglumine". It was described in 1981 by Hanns-Joachim Weinmann and colleagues  and introduced as the first MRI contrast agent in 1987 by the Schering AG. It is used to assist imaging of blood vessels and of inflamed or diseased tissue where the blood vessels become "leaky".  It is often used when viewing intracranial lesions with abnormal vascularity or abnormalities in the blood–brain barrier.  It is usually injected intravenously. Gd-DTPA is classed as an acyclic, ionic gadolinium contrast medium.  Its paramagnetic property reduces the T1 relaxation time (and to some extent the T2 and T2* relaxation times) in NMR, which is the source of its clinical utility.

Gadolinium based agents may cause a toxic reaction known as nephrogenic systemic fibrosis (NSF) in patients with severe kidney problems.

Compared to other gadolinium-based MRI contrast agents, Gadopentetate dimeglumine (Gd-DTPA2-) chelates allow delayed Gadolinium-enhanced Magnetic Resonance of Cartilage (dGEMRIC). The unique charge characteristic of this complex allows researchers to inversely measure spin-lattice relaxation times as they are related to the concentration of proteoglycan aggregates and charged glycosaminoglycan side chains in articular cartilage.

Chemical structure and mode of action
In the complex of Gd3+ and DTPA5− the gadolinium ion is 9-coordinate, surrounded by the 3 nitrogen atoms and 5 oxygen atoms from the carboxylate groups. The ninth coordination site is occupied by a water molecule. This water molecule is labile and exchanges rapidly with water molecules in the immediate vicinity of the gadolinium complex. The gadolinium ion has 7 unpaired electrons with parallel spins and is strongly paramagnetic with an 8S electronic ground state. The relaxation time of the water molecules is affected by their intermittent binding to the paramagnetic centre. This alters their MRI properties and enables contrast enhancement to be achieved.

Concerns 
Gadolinium is highly toxic and the accumulation of gadolinium in the brain has become a concern. The EU banned linear chelates in 2017.

References

External links 
 
 

MRI contrast agents
Organogadolinium compounds
Withdrawn drugs